Tafelberg is Afrikaans, Dutch and German for "table mountain". It may refer to:

Table Mountain, a flat-topped mountain overlooking Cape Town, South Africa
Tafelberg, Suriname, a mountain in Suriname
Tafelberg (Curaçao), a hill in Curaçao
Täfelberg, a mountain in Baden-Württemberg, Germany
Tafelberg (musical instrument), a type of percussive string instrument made by Yuri Landman
, South African book publishing company
, a former ship of the South African Navy

See also
 Table Mountain (disambiguation)